Samaya Sanjeevi is a 1957 Indian Tamil-language film directed by V. S. Raghavan and written by Pattu. The film stars Pattu, Vidyavathi, T. R. Ramachandran and Sandhya. Based on Pattu's play Dial Mr. Sanjeevi, it was released on 9 March 1957.

Plot

Cast 
List compiled from the database of Film News Anandan and from Thiraikalanjiyam Part 1

Pattu
Vidyavathi
T. R. Ramachandran
M. N. Nambiar
Sandhya
M. N. Rajam
K. Sarangapani
C. K. Saraswathi
Sivathanu
M. K. Moorthi
Kusalakumari

Production 
The film was produced by Pattu Rajagopal who also wrote the story and dialogues and also featured in one of the main characters in the film. Choreography was done by Madhavan and Krishna Rao. The film was made at Revathi Studios.

Soundtrack 
Music was composed by G. Ramanathan, while the lyrics were penned by A. Maruthakasi.

References

External links 

1950s lost films
1950s Tamil-language films
Films scored by G. Ramanathan
Indian films based on plays
Lost Indian films